Syzygium buxifolium, the boxleaf eugenia or fish-scale bush, is a species of flowering plant in the family Myrtaceae, native to northern Vietnam, southern China, Hainan, Taiwan, the Ryukyu Islands, and southern Kyushu, Japan. A shrub or small tree, it is suitable for hedges, containers, and bonsai. It is used as a street tree in a number of southern Chinese cities.

References

buxifolium
Ornamental plants
Plants used in bonsai
Flora of Vietnam
Flora of South-Central China
Flora of Southeast China
Flora of Hainan
Flora of Taiwan
Flora of the Ryukyu Islands
Flora of Japan
Plants described in 1833